The Miracle According to Salomé is a 2004 Portuguese film directed by Mário Barroso. It was Portugal's submission to the 77th Academy Awards for the Academy Award for Best Foreign Language Film, but was not accepted as a nominee.

See also

Cinema of Portugal
List of submissions to the 77th Academy Awards for Best Foreign Language Film

References

External links

2004 films
Portuguese drama films